The 2018 in cycling results is given as follows:

Cycle ball

International indoor cycling events
 May 11 & 12: 2018 UEC Juniors Indoor Cycling European Championships in  Bazenheid
 Cycle ball:  (Tim & Eric Lehmann) defeated  (Maximilian Schwendinger & Bastian Arnoldi), 5–1, in the final.
 Junior Artistic cycling winners:  Tim Weber (m) /  Julia Walser (f)
 June 1 & 2: 2018 UEC Elite Indoor Cycling European Championships in  Wiesbaden
 Cycle ball:  (Markus Bröll & Patrick Schnetzer)
 Elite Single Artistic cycling winners:  Lukas Kohl (m) /  Viola Brand (f)
 Elite Women's Pair Artistic cycling winners:  (Lena & Lisa Bringsken)
 Elite Mixed Pair Artistic cycling winners:  (Nina Stapf & Patrick Tisch)
 Elite Mixed ACT4 Artistic cycling winners:  (Annamaria Milo, Julia Dörner, Katharina Gülich, & Ramona Ressel)
 November 23–25: 2018 UCI Indoor Cycling World Championships in  Liège
 Elite Women's Pair Artistic cycling winners:  (Lena & Lisa Bringsken)
 Elite Mixed Pair Artistic cycling winners:  (Max Hanselmann & Serafin Schefold)
 Elite Mixed ACT4 Artistic cycling winners:  (Julia Dörner, Annamaria Milo, Ramona Ressel, & Katharina Gülich)

2018 Artistic Cycling World Cup
 February 10: ACWC #1 in  Prague
 Elite Singles winners:  Lukas Kohl (m) /  Milena Slupina (f)
 Women's Elite - Pair Artistic winner:  (Sophie-Marie Nattmann & Caroline Wurth)
 Mixed Elite - Artistic Cycling ACT4 winners:  (Melanie Schmid, Jennifer Schmid, Céline Burlet, & Flavia Zuber)
 Mixed Elite - Pair Artistic Cycling Mix winners:  (Serafin Schefold & Max Hanselmann)
 June 30: ACWC #2 in  Heerlen
 Elite Singles winners:  Lukas Kohl (m) /  Milena Slupina (f)
 Women's Elite - Pair Artistic winners:  (Sophie-Marie Nattmann & Caroline Wurth)
 Mixed Elite - Artistic Cycling ACT4 winners:  (Anton Köhler, Nicole Kerner, Fabian Kerner, & Maike Reinfurth) (default)
 Mixed Elite - Pair Artistic Cycling Mix winners:  (Serafin Schefold & Max Hanselmann)
 August 12: ACWC #3 in 
 Elite Singles winners:  Lukas Kohl (m) /  Viola Brand (f)
 Women's Elite - Pair Artistic winners:  (Sophie-Marie Nattmann & Caroline Wurth)
 Mixed Elite - Artistic Cycling ACT4 winners:  (Melanie Schmid, Jennifer Schmid, Céline Burlet, & Flavia Zuber)
 Mixed Elite - Pair Artistic Cycling Mix winners:  (Serafin Schefold & Max Hanselmann)
 November 17: ACWC #4 (final) in  Erlenbach
 Elite Singles winners:  Lukas Kohl (m) /  Maren Haase (f)
 Women's Elite - Pair Artistic winners:  (Sophie-Marie Nattmann & Caroline Wurth)
 Mixed Elite - Artistic Cycling ACT4 winners:  (Melanie Schmid, Jennifer Schmid, Céline Burlet, & Flavia Zuber)
 Mixed Elite - Pair Artistic Cycling Mix winners:  (Serafin Schefold & Max Hanselmann)

2018 Cycle-Ball World Cup
 April 14: CBWC #1 in  Kamenz
 Winners:  (André Kopp & Raphael Kopp)
 April 28: CBWC #2 in  Altdorf
 Winners:  (Markus Bröll & Patrick Schnetzer)
 May 26: CBWC #3 in  Beringen
 Winners:  (Florian Fischer & Simon König)
 August 11: CBWC #4 in 
 Winners:  (Felix Weinert & Valentin Notheis)
 September 8: CBWC #5 in  Krofdorf-Gleiberg
 Winners:  (Markus Bröll & Patrick Schnetzer)
 September 29: CBWC #6 in  Sangerhausen
 Winners:  (Markus Bröll & Patrick Schnetzer)
 October 13: CBWC #7 in  St. Gallen
 Winners:  (Bernd Mlady & Gerhard Mlady)
 November 3: CBWC #8 (final) in  Höchst
 Winners:  (Florian Fischer & Simon König)

Cycling - BMX

International BMX events
 March 21: 2018 Oceania BMX Continental Championships in  Bunbury, Western Australia
 Elite winners:  Corey Frieswyk (m) /  Sarah Walker (f)
 Junior winners:  Nathaniel Rodway (m) /  Ashlee Miller (f)
 May 26 & 27: 2018 Asian BMX Continental Championships in  Chai Nat
 Elite winners:  Rio Akbar (m) /  LU Yan (f)
 Junior winners:  Asuma Nakai (m) /  Kanami Tanno (f)
 June 5–9: 2018 UCI BMX World Championships in  Baku
 Elite winners:  Sylvain André (m) /  Laura Smulders (f)
 Junior winners:  Leo Garoyan (m) /  Indy Scheepers (f)
 July 13–15: 2018 Junior European BMX Continental Championships in  Sarrians
 Junior winners:  Leo Garoyan (m) /  Indy Scheepers (f)
 July 20: 2018 Pan American BMX Continental Championships in  Medellín
 Elite winners:  Anderson Ezequiel de Souza Filho (m) /  Priscilla Carnaval (f)
 Junior winners:  Juan Esteban Naranjo Murillo (m) /  Laura Tatiana Ordoñez Urbano (f)
 August 10 & 11: 2018 UEC BMX European Championships in  Glasgow
 Elite winners:  Kyle Evans (m) /  Laura Smulders (f)
 November 7–11: 2018 UCI Urban Cycling World Championships (BMX Freestyle) in  Chengdu
 Elite winners:  Justin Dowell (m) /  Perris Benegas (f)
 November 9 & 10: 2018 African BMX Continental Championships in 
 Elite winners:  Dylan Eggar (m) /  Arafa Hassan (f)
 Junior winners:  Ahmed Clip (m) /  Alaa El Sayed (f)

2018 UCI BMX Supercross World Cup
 March 31 & April 1: SXWC #1 & #2 in  Saint-Quentin-en-Yvelines
 Men's Elite winners:  Niek Kimmann (#1) /  Joris Daudet (#2)
 Women's Elite winner:  Laura Smulders (2 times)
 May 5 & 6: SXWC #3 & #4 in  Papendal
 Men's Elite winners:  Niek Kimmann (#1) /  Sylvain André (#2)
 Women's Elite winners:  Laura Smulders (#1) /  Alise Willoughby (#2)
 May 12 & 13: SXWC #5 & #6 in  Heusden-Zolder
 Men's Elite winner:  Niek Kimmann (2 times)
 Women's Elite winners:  Bethany Shriever (#1) /  Laura Smulders (#2)
 September 29 & 30: SXWC #7 & #8 (finals) in  Santiago del Estero
 Men's Elite winners:  Corben Sharrah (#1) /  Joris Daudet (#2)
 Women's Elite winners:  Laura Smulders (#1) /  Saya Sakakibara (#2)

2018 FISE BMX Freestyle Park World Cup
 April 6–8: FPWC #1 in  Hiroshima
 Elite winners:  Brandon Loupos (m) /  Hannah Roberts (f)
 May 9–13: FPWC #2 in  Montpellier
 Note: The Men's Elite Final BMX Freestyle Park WC here was cancelled, due to weather contidions
 Women's Elite winner:  Oike Minato
 July 14 & 15: FPWC #3 in  Edmonton
 Elite winners:  Logan Martin /  Hannah Roberts
 November 2–4: FPWC #4 (final) in  Chengdu
 Elite winners:  Jake Wallwork (m) /  Lara Lessmann (f)

2018 UEC BMX European Cup
 March 24 & 25: UEC BMX #1 & #2 in  Verona
 Elite #1 winners:  Niek Kimmann (m) /  Laura Smulders (f)
 Elite #2 winners:  Kyle Evans (m) /  Saya Sakakibara (f)
 Men's Junior winners:  Tino Popma (#1) /  Ross Cullen (#2)
 Women's Junior winner:  Zoe Claessens (2 times)
 April 14 & 15: UEC BMX #3 & #4 in  Heusden-Zolder
 Elite winners:  Niek Kimmann (m; 2 times) /  Laura Smulders (f; 2 times)
 Men's Junior winners:  Leo Garoyan (#1) /  Baptiste Vieillard (#2)
 Women's Junior winner:  Zoe Claessens (2 times)
 April 28 & 29: UEC BMX #5 & #6 in  Kampen
 Men's Elite winners:  Twan van Gendt (#1) /  Mitchel Schotman (#2)
 Women's Elite winner:  Judy Baauw (2 times)
 Junior winners:  Leo Garoyan (m; 2 times) /  Zoe Claessens (f; 2 times)
 May 19 & 20: UEC BMX #7 & #8 (finals) in  Blegny
 Elite winners:  Joris Harmsen (m; 2 times) /  Laura Smulders (f; 2 times)
 Men's Junior winners:  Bart van Bemmelen (#1) /  Edvards Glazers (#2)
 Women's Junior winner:  Indy Scheepers (2 times)

Cycling - Cyclo-cross
2017–18 International Cyclo-cross events
 November 4, 2017: 2017 Masters European Continental Championships in  Tábor
 Masters 30–34 winners:  Kenny Geluykens (m) /  Petra Fortelná (f)
 Masters 35–39 winners:  Jürg Graf (m) /  Chiara Selva (f)
 Masters 40–44 winners:  Massimo Folcarelli (m) /  Silke Keil (f)
 Masters 45–49 winners:  Edwin Raats (m) /  Anna Persson (f)
 Masters 50–54 winners:  Guido Verhaegen (m) /  Tea Lang (f)
 Masters 55–59 winners:  Armin Raible (m) /  Gjertrud Bø (f)
 Men's Masters 60–64 winner:  Benny Andersson
 Women's Masters 60+ winner:  Christine Dufond-Demattei
 Men's Masters 65–69 winner:  Paul Graf
 Men's Masters 70–74 winner:  Victor Barnett
 November 5, 2017: 2017 Pan American Cyclocross Championships in  Louisville
 Elite winners:  Stephen Hyde (m) /  Katie Compton (f)
 U23 winners:  Gage Hecht (m) /  Emma White (f)
 Men's Junior winner:  Benjamín Gomez Villafañe
 November 5, 2017: 2017 Cyclocross European Championships in  Tábor
 Elite winners:  Mathieu van der Poel (m) /  Sanne Cant (f)
 U23 winners:  Eli Iserbyt (m) /  Chiara Teocchi (f)
 Men's Junior winner:  Loris Rouiller
 December 1 & 2, 2017: 2017 UCI Masters Cyclo-cross World Championships in  Mol
 Masters 30–34 winners:  Nicolas Lüthi (m) /  Manuella Glon (f)
 Masters 35–39 winners:  Matt Shriver (m) /  Viviane Rognant (f)
 Masters 40–44 winners:  Agustín Navarro Vidal (m) /  Kate Eedy (f)
 Masters 45–49 winners:  Erik Dekker (m) /  Helen Pattinson (f)
 Masters 50–54 winners:  Guido Verhaegen (m) /  Elizabeth Sheldon (f)
 Masters 55–59 winners:  Jos Bogaerts (m) /  Gjertrud Bø (f)
 Masters 60–64 winners:  Robin Delve (m) /  Nicola Davies (f)
 Masters 65–69 winners:  Dave McMullen (m) /  Christine Dufond-Dematteis (f)
 Men's Masters 70–74 winner:  William Abbott
 Masters 75+ winners:  John Ginley (m) /  Julie Lockhart (f)
 February 3 & 4: 2018 UCI Cyclo-cross World Championships in  Valkenburg aan de Geul–Limburg
 Elite winners:  Wout van Aert (m) /  Sanne Cant (f)
 U23 winners:  Eli Iserbyt (m) /  Evie Richards (f)
 Men's Junior winner:  Ben Tulett

2017–18 UCI Cyclo-cross World Cup
 September 16: #1 in  Iowa City
 Elite winners:  Mathieu van der Poel (m) /  Kateřina Nash (f)
 September 24: #2 in  Waterloo
 Elite winners:  Mathieu van der Poel (m) /  Sanne Cant (f)
 October 22: #3 in  Koksijde
 Elite winners:  Mathieu van der Poel (m) /  Maud Kaptheijns (f)
 Men's Junior winner:  Pim Ronhaar
 Men's U23 winner:  Tom Pidcock
 November 19: #4 in  Bogense
 Elite winners:  Mathieu van der Poel (m) /  Sanne Cant (f)
 Men's Junior winner:  Tomáš Kopecký
 Men's U23 winner:  Tom Pidcock
 November 25: #5 in  Zeven
 Elite winners:  Wout van Aert (m) /  Sanne Cant (f)
 Men's Junior winner:  Pim Ronhaar
 Men's U23 winner:  Eli Iserbyt
 December 17: #6 in  Namur
 Elite winners:  Wout van Aert (m) /  Evie Richards (f)
 Men's Junior winner:  Loris Rouiller
 Men's U23 winner:  Tom Pidcock
 December 26: #7 in  Heusden-Zolder
 Elite winners:  Mathieu van der Poel (m) /  Sanne Cant (f)
 Men's Junior winner:  Tomáš Kopecký
 Men's U23 winner:  Tom Pidcock
 January 21: #8 in  Nommay
 Elite winners:  Mathieu van der Poel (m) /  Katie Compton (f)
 Men's Junior winner:  Mees Hendrikx
 Men's U23 winner:  Thijs Aerts
 January 28: #9 (final) in  Hoogerheide
 Elite winners:  Mathieu van der Poel (m) /  Sanne Cant (f)
 Men's Junior winner:  Niels Vandeputte
 Men's U23 winner:  Eli Iserbyt

2017–18 Cyclo-cross Superprestige
 October 1, 2017: #1 in  Gieten
 Elite winners:  Mathieu van der Poel (m) /  Maud Kaptheijns (f)
 Men's Junior winner:  Ryan Kamp
 Men's U23 winner:  Jens Dekker
 October 15, 2017: #2 in  Zonhoven
 Elite winners:  Mathieu van der Poel (m) /  Maud Kaptheijns (f)
 Men's Junior winner:  Pim Ronhaar
 Men's U23 winner:  Jens Dekker
 October 21, 2017: #3 in  Boom
 Elite winners:  Wout van Aert (m) /  Maud Kaptheijns (f)
 Men's Junior winner:  Xander Geysels
 Men's U23 winner:  Tom Pidcock
 October 29, 2017: #4 in  Oostkamp
 Elite winners:  Mathieu van der Poel (m) /  Maud Kaptheijns (f)
 Men's Junior winner:  Ryan Kamp
 Men's U23 winner:  Jens Dekker
 November 12, 2017: #5 in  Gavere
 Elite winners:  Wout van Aert (m) /  Ellen Van Loy (f)
 Men's Junior winner:  Pim Ronhaar
 Men's U23 winner:  Tom Pidcock
 December 30, 2017: #6 in  Diegem
 Elite winners:  Mathieu van der Poel (m) /  Sanne Cant (f)
 Men's Junior winner:  Loris Rouiller
 Men's U23 winner:  Tom Pidcock
 February 11, 2018: #7 in  Hoogstraten
 Elite winners:  Mathieu van der Poel (m) /  Sanne Cant (f)
 Men's Junior winner:  Ryan Kamp
 Men's U23 winner:  Eli Iserbyt
 February 17, 2018: #8 in  Middelkerke
 Elite winners:  Mathieu van der Poel (m) /  Sanne Cant (f)
 Men's Junior winner:  Niels Vandeputte
 Men's U23 winner:  Tom Pidcock

2017–18 DVV Trophy
 October 8: #1 in  Ronse
 Elite winners:  Lars van der Haar (m) /  Katie Compton (f)
 Men's Junior winner:  Loris Rouiller
 Men's U23 winner:  Eli Iserbyt
 November 1: #2 in  Melden
 Elite winners:  Mathieu van der Poel (m) /  Helen Wyman (f)
 Men's Junior winner:  Ben Tulett
 Men's U23 winner:  Tom Pidcock
 November 26: #3 in  Hamme
 Elite winners:  Mathieu van der Poel (m) /  Sanne Cant (f)
 Men's Junior winner:  Loris Rouiller
 Men's U23 winner:  Eli Iserbyt
 December 9: #4 in  Essen
 Elite winners:  Mathieu van der Poel (m) /  Sanne Cant (f)
 Men's Junior winner:  Jarno Bellens
 Men's U23 winner:  Eli Iserbyt
 December 16: #5 in  Antwerp
 Elite winners:  Mathieu van der Poel (m) /  Sanne Cant (f)
 Men's Junior winner:  Wout Vervoort
 Men's U23 winner:  Eli Iserbyt
 December 28: #6 in  Loenhout
 Elite winners:  Mathieu van der Poel (m) /  Sanne Cant (f)
 Men's Junior winner:  Ryan Cortjens
 Men's U23 winner:  Eli Iserbyt
 January 1: #7 in  Baal
 Elite winners:  Mathieu van der Poel (m) /  Katie Compton (f)
 Men's Junior winner:  Loris Rouiller
 Men's U23 winner:  Eli Iserbyt
 February 10: #8 in  Lille
 Elite winners:  Mathieu van der Poel (m) /  Sanne Cant (f)
 Men's Junior winner:  Niels Vandeputte
 Men's U23 winner:  Eli Iserbyt

Cycling - Mountain Bike
International mountain biking events
 February 9–11: 2018 Oceania Mountain Bike Championships (XCO & DHI) in  Dunedin
 Elite XCO winners:  Anton Cooper (m) /  Samara Sheppard (f)
 Junior XCO winners:  Cameron Wright (m) /  Phoebe Young (f)
 U23 XCO winners:  Eden Cruise (m) /  Charlotte Rayner (f)
 Elite Downhill winners:  Samuel Blenkinsop (m) /  Virginia Armstrong (f)
 April 4–8: 2018 Pan American Mountain Bike Championships (XCO, XCE, & XCR) in  Pereira
 Elite XCO winners:  Luiz Henrique Cocuzzi (m) /  Raiza Goulão (f)
 Junior XCO winners:  Martin Vidaurre Kossman (m) /  Fatima Anahi Hijar Marin (f)
 Men's U23 XCO winner:  Jose Gerardo Ulloa Arevalo
 Elite XCE winners:  Juan Fernando Monroy (m) /  Michela Molina (f)
 Mixed Elite XCR winners: 
 April 7: 2018 European Mountain Bike Championships (DHI only) in  Lousã
 Elite Downhill winners:  Francisco Pardal (m) /  Monika Hrastnik (f)
 April 22: 2018 European Mountain Bike Championships (XCM only) in  Spilimbergo
 Elite XCM winners:  Alexey Medvedev (m) /  Gunn-Rita Dahle Flesjå (f)
 May 2–6: 2018 Asian Mountain Bike Championships (XCO, XCR, & DHI) in  Danao, Cebu
 Elite XCO winners:  Kohei Yamamoto (m) /  LI Hongfeng (f)
 Junior XCO winners:  YUAN Jinwei (m) /  Urara Kawaguchi (f)
 U23 XCO winners:  LYU Xianjing (m) /  Ariana Thea Patrice Dormitorio (f)
 Elite Downhill winners:  CHIANG Sheng Shan (m) /  Vipavee Deekaballes (f)
 Mixed Elite XCR winners: 
 June 30: 2018 European Mountain Bike Championships (Ultra XCM only) in  Vielha-Val d'Aran
 Elite XCM winners:  Joseba Albizu (m) /  Clara Fernandez Chafer (f)
 July 26–29: 2018 European Mountain Bike Championships (XCO, XCE for U23/Juniors, & XCR) in  Graz-Stattegg
 Elite XCE winners:  Titouan Perrin-Ganier (m) /  Iryna Popova (f)
 Mixed Elite XCR winners: 
 Junior XCO winners:  Alexandre Balmer (m) /  Laura Stigger (f)
 U23 XCO winners:  Joshua Dubau (m) /  Sina Frei (f)
 August 7: 2018 European Mountain Bike Championships (XCO Elite only) in  Glasgow
 Elite XCO winners:  Lars Förster (m) /  Jolanda Neff (f)
 September 4–9: 2018 UCI Mountain Bike World Championships in  Lenzerheide
 Elite XCO winners:  Nino Schurter (m) /  Kate Courtney (f)
 Junior XCO winners:  Alexandre Balmer (m) /  Laura Stigger (f)
 U23 XCO winners:  Alan Hatherly (m) /  Alessandra Keller (f)
 Elite Downhill winners:  Loïc Bruni (m) /  Rachel Atherton (f)
 Junior Downhill winners:  Kade Edwards (m) /  Valentina Höll (f)
 Mixed Elite XCO winners: 
 September 14 & 15: 2018 UCI Mountain Bike Marathon World Championships in  Auronzo di Cadore
 Elite XCM winners:  Henrique Avancini (m) /  Annika Langvad (f)
 October 12–14: 2018 Pan American Mountain Bike Championships (DHI only) in  Manizales
 Elite Downhill winners:  Rafael Gutiérrez Villegas (m) /  Mariana Salazar (f)

2018 UCI Mountain Bike World Cup
 March 10: #1 in  Stellenbosch (XCO only)
 Elite winners:  Sam Gaze (m) /  Annika Langvad (f)
 U23 winners:  Petter Fagerhaug (m) /  Malene Degn (f)
 April 21 & 22: #2 in  Lošinj (DHI only)
 Elite winners:  Aaron Gwin (m) /  Myriam Nicole (f)
 Junior winners:  Thibaut Daprela (m) /  Valentina Höll (f)
 May 19 & 20: #3 in  Albstadt (XCO & XCC)
 Elite XCO winners:  Nino Schurter (m) /  Jolanda Neff (f)
 U23 XCO winners:  Joshua Dubau (m) /  Sina Frei (f)
 Elite Short Circuit XC winners:  Mathieu van der Poel (m) /  Annika Langvad (f)
 May 26 & 27: #4 in  Nové Město na Moravě (XCO & XCC)
 Elite XCO winners:  Nino Schurter (m) /  Annika Langvad (f)
 U23 XCO winners:  Vlad Dascalu (m) /  Sina Frei (f)
 Elite Short Circuit XC winners:  Sam Gaze (m) /  Annika Langvad (f)
 June 2 & 3: #5 in  Fort William (DHI only)
 Elite winners:  Amaury Pierron (m) /  Tahnee Seagrave (f)
 Junior winners:  Kye A'Hern (m) /  Valentina Höll (f)
 June 9 & 10: #6 in  Leogang (DHI only)
 Elite winners:  Amaury Pierron (m) /  Rachel Atherton (f)
 Junior winners:  Kye A'Hern (m) /  Valentina Höll (f)
 July 7 & 8: #7 in  Val di Sole (XCO, DHI, & XCC)
 Elite XCO winners:  Nino Schurter (m) /  Maja Włoszczowska (f)
 U23 XCO winners:  Petter Fagerhaug (m) /  Sina Frei (f)
 Elite Short Circuit XC winners:  Mathieu van der Poel (m) /  Annika Langvad (f)
 Elite Downhill winners:  Amaury Pierron (m) /  Tahnee Seagrave (f)
 Junior Downhill winners:  Thibaut Daprela (m) /  Valentina Höll (f)
 July 14 & 15: #8 in  Vallnord (XCO, DHI, & XCC)
 Elite XCO winners:  Gerhard Kerschbaumer (m) /  Gunn-Rita Dahle Flesjå (f)
 U23 XCO winners:  Joshua Dubau (m) /  Sina Frei (f)
 Elite Short Circuit XC winners:  Henrique Avancini (m) /  Alessandra Keller (f)
 Elite Downhill winners:  Loris Vergier (m) /  Tahnee Seagrave (f)
 Junior Downhill winners:  Thibaut Daprela (m) /  Valentina Höll (f)
 August 10–12: #9 in  Mont-Sainte-Anne (XCO, XCC, & DHI)
 Elite XCO winners:  Mathias Flückiger (m) /  Jolanda Neff (f)
 U23 XCO winners:  Alan Hatherly (m) /  Sina Frei (f)
 Elite Short Circuit XC winners:  Sam Gaze (m) /  Annika Langvad (f)
 Elite Downhill winners:  Loïc Bruni (m) /  Rachel Atherton (f)
 Junior Downhill winners:  Thibaut Daprela (m) /  Valentina Höll (f)
 August 25 & 26: #10 (final) in  La Bresse (XCO, XCC, & DHI)
 Elite XCO winners:  Nino Schurter (m) /  Jolanda Neff (f)
 U23 XCO winners:  Petter Fagerhaug (m) /  Sina Frei (f)
 Elite Short Circuit XC winners:  Mathieu van der Poel (m) /  Annika Langvad (f)
 Elite Downhill winners:  Martin Maes (m) /  Rachel Atherton (f)
 Junior Downhill winners:  Thibaut Daprela (m) /  Valentina Höll (f)

Cycling - Para-cycling
 Note: For all the detailed results for the events below, click here.''
 February 17–19: 2018 Asian Para-Cycling Championships (Track) in  Nilai
 March 22–25: 2018 UCI Para-cycling Track World Championships (Track) in  Rio de Janeiro
 May 3–6: 2018 UCI Para-cycling Road World Cup #1 (Road) in  Ostend
 July 6–8: 2018 UCI Para-cycling Road World Cup #2 (Road) in  Emmen
 August 2–5: 2018 UCI Para-cycling Road World Championships (Road) in  Maniago
 August 15–19: 2018 UCI Para-cycling Road World Cup #3 (Road) in  Baie-Comeau

Cycling - Road

2018 Grand Tour Events
 May 4–27: 2018 Giro d'Italia
 Winner:  Chris Froome (first Giro d'Italia win & sixth Grand Tour win)
 July 7–29: 2018 Tour de France
 Winner:  Geraint Thomas (first Tour de France win & first Grand Tour win)
 August 25 – September 16: 2018 Vuelta a España
 Winner:  Simon Yates (first Vuelta a España win & first Grand Tour win)

International road cycling events
 February 8–10: 2018 Asian Cycling Championships in  Naypyidaw
 Elite Individual road race winners:  Yousif Mirza (m) /  Nguyễn Thị Thật (f)
 U23 Individual road race winners:  Masaki Yamamoto (m) /  Zixin Liu (f)
 Juniors Individual road race winners:  Taisei Hino (m) /  Vivien Chiu (f)
 Elite Individual time trial winners:  Cheung King Lok (m) /  Lee Ju-mi (f)
 U23 Individual time trial winners:  Hang Shi (m) /  Zixin Liu (f)
 Juniors Individual time trial winners:  Daniil Pronskiy (m) /  Marina Kurnossova (f)
 Men's Team time trial winners:  (Yukiya Arashiro, Fumiyuki Beppu, Rei Onodera, Masaki Yamamoto, Shoi Matsuda, Yusuke Hatanaka)
 February 13–18: 2018 African Continental Road Cycling Championships in 
 Elite Individual Road Race winners:  Amanuel Ghebreigzabhier Werkilul (m) /  Bisrat Ghebremeskel (f)
 Juniors Individual Road Race winners:  Biniam Hailu (m) /  Desiet Tekeste (f)
 Elite Individual time trial winners:  Mekseb Debesay (m) /  Mossana Debesay (f)
 Juniors Individual time trial winners:  Biniam Hailu (m) /  Desiet Tekeste (f)
 Elite Team time trial winners:  (Amanuel Ghebreigzabhier Werkilul, Saymon Musie Mehari, Mekseb Debesay, Metkel Eyob) /  (Eyeru Tesfoam Gebru, Tsega Gebre Beyene, Selam Amha)
 Juniors Team time trial winners:  (Biniam Hailu, Hager Mesfin, Tomas Yosief) (m) /  (Samantha Mushimiyimana, Violette Irakoze, Valantine Nzayisenga, Jeanette Manishimwe)
 March 23–25: 2018 Oceania Cycling Championships in  Tasmania
 Elite Individual Road Race winners:  Chris Harper (m) /  Sharlotte Lucas (f)
 Elite Individual Time Trial winners:  Hamish Bond (m) /  Grace Brown (f)
 Junior Individual Road Race winners:  Carter Turnbull (m) /  Sarah Gigante (f)
 Junior Individual Time Trial winners:  Lucas Plapp (m) /  Anya Louw (f)
 U23 Individual Time Trial winners:  Jake Marryatt (m) /  Mikayla Harvey (f)
 May 3–6: 2018 Pan American Road Cycling Championships in  San Juan
 Elite Individual Road Race winners:  Juan Sebastián Molano (m) /  Arlenis Sierra (f)
 Elite Individual Time Trial winners:  Walter Vargas (m) /  Amber Neben (f)
 Men's U23 winners:  Federico Nicolas Vivas (IRR) /  Diego Agustin Ferreyra Geldrez (ITT)
 July 12–15: 2018 UEC Juniors & U23 Road European Championships in 
 Junior Individual Time Trial winners:  Remco Evenepoel (m) /  Vittoria Guazzini (f)
 Junior Women's Individual Road Race winner:  Aigul Gareeva
 U23 Individual Time Trial winners:  Edoardo Affini (m) /  Aafke Soet (f)
 Women's U23 Individual Road Race winner:  Nikola Nosková
 August 5–12: 2018 European Road Championships in  Glasgow
 Elite Individual Road Race winners:  Matteo Trentin (m) /  Marta Bastianelli (f)
 Elite Individual Time Trial winners:  Victor Campenaerts (m) /  Ellen van Dijk (f)
 Junior Men's Individual Road Race & Time Trial winner:  Remco Evenepoel
 Junior Women's Individual Road Race winner:  Aigul Gareeva
 Junior Women's Individual Time Trial winner:  Vittoria Guazzini
 U23 Individual Road Race winners:  Marc Hirschi (m) /  Nikola Nosková (f)
 U23 Individual Time Trial winners:  Edoardo Affini (m) /  Aafke Soet (f)
 September 23–30: 2018 UCI Road World Championships in  Innsbruck
 Elite Road Race winners:  Alejandro Valverde (m) /  Anna van der Breggen (f)
 Elite Individual Time Trial winners:  Rohan Dennis (m) /  Annemiek van Vleuten (f)
 Elite Team Time Trial winners:   (m) /  Canyon–SRAM (f)
 Junior Road Race winners:  Remco Evenepoel (m) /  Laura Stigger (f)
 Junior Time Trial winners:  Remco Evenepoel (m) /  Rozemarijn Ammerlaan (f)
 Men's U23 winners:  Marc Hirschi (Road Race) /  Mikkel Bjerg (Time Trial)

2018 UCI World Tour
 January 16–21:  2018 Tour Down Under Winner:  Daryl Impey
 January 28:  2018 Great Ocean Road Race Winner:  Jay McCarthy
 February 21–25:  2018 Abu Dhabi Tour Winner:  Alejandro Valverde
 February 24:  2018 Omloop Het Nieuwsblad Winner:  Michael Valgren
 March 3:  2018 Strade Bianche Winner:  Tiesj Benoot
 March 4–11:  2018 Paris–Nice Winner:  Marc Soler
 March 7–13:  2018 Tirreno–Adriatico Winner:  Michał Kwiatkowski
 March 17:  2018 Milan–San Remo Winner:  Vincenzo Nibali
 March 19–25:  2018 Volta a Catalunya Winner:  Alejandro Valverde
 March 23:  2018 E3 Harelbeke Winner:  Niki Terpstra
 March 25:  2018 Gent–Wevelgem Winner:  Peter Sagan
 March 28:  2018 Dwars door Vlaanderen Winner:  Yves Lampaert
 April 1:  2018 Tour of Flanders Winner:  Niki Terpstra
 April 2–7:  2018 Tour of the Basque Country Winner:  Primož Roglič
 April 8:  2018 Paris–Roubaix Winner:  Peter Sagan
 April 15:  2018 Amstel Gold Race Winner:  Michael Valgren
 April 18:  2018 La Flèche Wallonne Winner:  Julian Alaphilippe
 April 22:  2018 Liège–Bastogne–Liège Winner:  Bob Jungels
 April 24–29:  2018 Tour de Romandie Winner:  Primož Roglič
 May 1:  2018 Eschborn–Frankfurt Winner:  Alexander Kristoff
 May 13–19:  2018 Tour of California Winner:  Egan Bernal
 June 3–10:  2018 Critérium du Dauphiné Winner:  Geraint Thomas
 June 9–17:  2018 Tour de Suisse Winner:  Richie Porte
 July 29:  2018 London–Surrey Classic Winner:  Pascal Ackermann
 August 4:  2018 Clásica de San Sebastián Winner:  Julian Alaphilippe
 August 4–10:  2018 Tour de Pologne Winner:  Michał Kwiatkowski
 August 13–19: / 2018 BinckBank Tour Winner:  Matej Mohorič
 August 19:  2018 EuroEyes Cyclassics Winner:  Elia Viviani
 August 26:  2018 Bretagne Classic Ouest–France Winner:  Oliver Naesen
 September 7:  2018 Grand Prix Cycliste de Québec Winner:  Michael Matthews
 September 9:  2018 Grand Prix Cycliste de Montréal Winner:  Michael Matthews
 October 9 – 14:  2018 Presidential Tour of Turkey Winner:  Eduard Prades (Euskadi–Murias)
 October 13:  2018 Il Lombardia Winner:  Thibaut Pinot (Groupama–FDJ)
 October 16–21:  2018 Tour of Guangxi (final) Winner:  Gianni Moscon

2018 UCI Women's World Tour
 March 3:  2018 Strade Bianche Donne Winner:  Anna van der Breggen
 March 11:  2018 Ronde van Drenthe Winner:  Amy Pieters
 March 18:  2018 Trofeo Alfredo Binda-Comune di Cittiglio Winner:  Katarzyna Niewiadoma (Canyon–SRAM)
 March 22:  2018 Three Days of Bruges–De Panne Winner:  Jolien D'Hoore
 March 25:  2018 Gent–Wevelgem Winner:  Marta Bastianelli
 April 1:  2018 Tour of Flanders for Women Winner:  Anna van der Breggen
 April 15:  2018 Amstel Gold Race Winner:  Chantal Blaak
 April 18:  2018 Flèche Wallonne Winner:  Anna van der Breggen
 April 22:  2018 Liège–Bastogne–Liège Winner:  Anna van der Breggen
 April 26–28:  2018 Tour of Chongming Island Winner:  Charlotte Becker
 May 17–19:  2018 Tour of California Winner:  Katie Hall
 May 19–22:  2018 Emakumeen Euskal Bira Winner:  Amanda Spratt
 June 13–17:  2018 The Women's Tour Winner:  Coryn Rivera
 July 6–15:  2018 Giro Rosa Winner:  Annemiek van Vleuten
 July 17:  2018 La Course by Le Tour de France Winner:  Annemiek van Vleuten
 July 28:  2018 RideLondon Winner:  Kirsten Wild
 August 11:  2018 Crescent Women World Cup Vårgårda TTT Winners: 
 August 13:  2018 Open de Suède Vårgårda Road Race Winner:  Marianne Vos
 August 16:  2018 Ladies Tour of Norway TTT Winners: 
 August 17–19:  2018 Ladies Tour of Norway Road Race Winner:  Marianne Vos
 August 25:  2018 GP de Plouay – Bretagne Winner:  Amy Pieters
 August 28 – September 2:  2018 Holland Ladies Tour Winner:  Annemiek van Vleuten
 September 15 & 16:  2018 La Madrid Challenge by La Vuelta Winner:  Ellen van Dijk
 October 21:  2018 Tour of Guangxi Women's WorldTour Race (final) Winner:  Arlenis Sierra (Astana Women's Team)

Cycling - Track

International track cycling events
 November 20–23, 2017: 2018 Oceania Track Championships in  Cambridge
 For all results, click here. 
 February 7–10: 2018 African Track Championships in  Casablanca
 Elite Keirin winners:  Jean Spies (m) /  Ebtissam Mohamed (f)
 Elite Points Race winners:  Steven van Heerden (m) /  Ebtissam Mohamed (f)
 Elite Pursuit winners:  Gert Fouche (m) /  Ebtissam Mohamed (f)
 Elite Scratch winners:  Yacine Chalel (m) /  Ebtissam Mohamed (f)
 Elite Sprint winners:  Jean Spies (m) /  Ebtissam Mohamed (f)
 Elite Team Pursuit winners:  (m) /  (f)
 Elite Team Sprint winners:  (m) /  (f)
 Men's Elite Time Trial winner:  Jean Spies
 Junior Keirin winners:  Youcef Boukhari (m) /  Courtney Smith (f)
 Junior Pursuit winners:  Assem Elhosseiny Khalil (m) /  Courtney Smith (f)
 Junior Sprint winners:  Youcef Boukhari (m) /  Courtney Smith (f)
 Junior Time Trial winners:  Mohamed Farag (m) /  Courtney Smith (f)
 Men's Junior Points Race winners:  Youssef Abouelhassan
 Men's Junior Scratch winners:  Youcef Boukhari
 Men's Junior Team Pursuit winners: 
 Men's Junior Team Sprint winners: 
 February 16–20: 2018 Asian Track Cycling Championships in  Nilai
 Elite Individual Pursuit winners:  Ryo Chikatani (m) /  Lee Ju-mi (f)
 Elite Keirin winners:  Tomoyuki Kawabata (m) /  Lee Wai Sze (f)
 Elite Madison winners:  (Cheung King Lok & Leung Chun Wing) (m) /  (Kisato Nakamura & Yumi Kajihara) (f)
 Elite Omnium winners:  Eiya Hashimoto (m) /  Yumi Kajihara (f)
 Elite Points Race winners:  Yousif Mirza (m) /  Jupha Somnet (f)
 Elite Scratch winners:  GUO Liang (m) /  Huang Ting-ying (f)
 Elite Sprint winners:  Kazunari Watanabe (m) /  Lee Wai Sze (f)
 Elite Time Trial winners:  Tomohiro Fukaya (m) /  Lee Wai Sze (f)
 Elite Team Pursuit winners:  (m) /  (f)
 Elite Team Sprint winners:  (m) /  (f)
 February 28 – March 4: 2018 UCI Track Cycling World Championships in  Apeldoorn
 The  won both the gold and overall medal tallies.

2017–18 UCI Track Cycling World Cup
 November 3–5, 2017: TCWC #1 in  Pruszków
 Keirin winners:  Matthijs Büchli (m) /  Kristina Vogel (f)
 Madison winners:  (Callum Scotson & Cameron Meyer) (m) /  (Lotte Kopecky & Jolien D'Hoore) (f)
 Omnium winners:  Niklas Larsen (m) /  Kirsten Wild (f)
 Points Race winners:  Nikita Panassenko (m) /  Lotte Kopecky (f)
 Scratch winners:  Robbe Ghys (m) /  Maria Averina (f)
 Sprint winners:  Matthew Glaetzer (m) /  Kristina Vogel (f)
 Team Pursuit winners:  (m) /  (f)
 Team Sprint winners:  (m) /  (f)
 Women's Individual Pursuit winner:  Justyna Kaczkowska
 November 10–12, 2017: TCWC #2 in  Manchester
 Men's 1 km Time Trial winner:  Matthew Glaetzer
 Women's 500 m Time Trial winner:  Daria Shmeleva
 Keirin winners:  Matthijs Büchli (m) /  Kristina Vogel (f)
 Madison winners:  (Niklas Larsen & Casper von Folsach) (m) /  (Elinor Barker & Katie Archibald) (f)
 Omnium winners:  Benjamin Thomas (m) /  Jennifer Valente (f)
 Scratch winners:  Nikita Panassenko (m) /  Rachele Barbieri (f)
 Sprint winners:  Harrie Lavreysen (m) /  Kristina Vogel (f)
 Team Pursuit winners:  (m) /  (f)
 Team Sprint winners:  (m) /  (f)
 December 1–3, 2017: TCWC #3 in  Milton, Ontario
 Keirin winners:  Harrie Lavreysen (m) /  Kristina Vogel (f)
 Madison winners:  (Kenny De Ketele & Lindsay De Vylder) (m) /  (Katie Archibald & Ellie Dickinson) (f)
 Omnium winners:  Niklas Larsen (m) /  Yumi Kajihara (f)
 Points Race winners:  Niklas Larsen (m) /  Katie Archibald (f)
 Sprint winners:  Jeffrey Hoogland (m) /  Kristina Vogel (f)
 Team Pursuit winners:  (m) /  (f)
 Team Sprint winners:  (m) /  (f)
 December 9 & 10, 2017: TCWC #4 in  Santiago
 Keirin winners:  Yuta Wakimoto (m) /  Madalyn Godby (f)
 Madison winners:  (Thomas Sexton & Campbell Stewart) (m) /  (Michaela Drummond & Racquel Sheath) (f)
 Omnium winners:  Daniel Holloway (m) /  Yumi Kajihara (f)
 Sprint winners:  Vasilijus Lendel (m) /  Lyubov Shulika (f)
 Team Pursuit winners:  (m) /  (f)
 Team Sprint winners:  (m) /  (f)
 January 19–21: TCWC #5 (final) in  Minsk
 Keirin winners:  Matthijs Büchli (m) /  Nicky Degrendele (f)
 Madison winners:  (Leung Chun Wing & Cheung King Lok) (m) /  (Letizia Paternoster & Maria Giulia Confalonieri) (f)
 Omnium winners:  Jan-Willem van Schip (m) /  Kirsten Wild (f)
 Points Race winners:  Jan-Willem van Schip (m) /  Kirsten Wild (f)
 Scratch winners:  Yauheni Karaliok (m) /  Aline Seitz (f)
 Sprint winners:  Matthijs Büchli (m) /  Pauline Grabosch (f)
 Team Pursuit winners:  Team KGF (m) /  (f)
 Team Sprint winners:  Beat Cycling Club (m) /  (f)
 Men's Individual Pursuit winner:  Charlie Tanfield

Cycling - Trials

International trials cycling events
 April 30: 2018 Asian Trials Continental Championships in  Saku
 Elite 20" winners:  Kazuki Terai (m) /  Kana Yokota (f)
 Elite Men's 26" winner:  Tomu Shiozaki
 Junior Men's winners:  Yuki Taniguchi (20" & default) /  Taichi Omata (26")
 July 20 & 21: 2018 UEC Trials European Continental Championships in  Moudon
 Men's Elite winners:  Ion Areitio Agirre (20") /  Jack Carthy (26")
 Junior Men's winners:  Alejandro Montalvo Milla (20") /  Oliver Widmann (26")
 Women's Open winner:  Nina Reichenbach
 November 5–11: 2018 UCI Urban Cycling World Championships (Trials) in  Chengdu
 Men's 20" winners:  Thomas Pechhacker (Elite) /  Alejandro Montalvo Milla (Junior)
 Men's 26" winners:  Jack Carthy (Elite) /  Oliver Widmann (Junior)
 Women's Open winner:  Nina Reichenbach

2018 UCI Trials World Cup
 July 7 & 8: #1 in  Vöcklabruck
 Men's Elite 20" winner:  Benito Jose Ros Charral
 Men's Elite 26" winner:  Jack Carthy
 Women's Elite winner:  Nina Reichenbach
 August 25 & 26: #2 in  Val di Sole
 Men's Elite 20" winner:  Alejandro Montalvo Milla
 Men's Elite 26" winner:  Nicolas Vallee
 Women's Elite winner:  Nina Reichenbach
 September 22 & 23: #3 in  Antwerp
 Men's Elite 20" winner:  Alejandro Montalvo Milla
 Men's Elite 26" winner:  Jack Carthy
 Women's Elite winner:  Nina Reichenbach
 October 13 & 14: #4 (final) in  Berlin
 Men's Elite 20" winner:  Dominik Oswald
 Men's Elite 26" winner:  Nicolas Vallee
 Women's Elite winner:  Nina Reichenbach

References

External links
 Union Cycliste Internationale - UCI - Official Site

 
2018 in sports
Cycle sport by year
2018 sport-related lists